The Miller's Daughter may refer to:

The Miller's Daughter (poem), by Alfred, Lord Tennyson
The Miller's Daughter (1905 film), based on the play Hazel Kirke
The Miller's Daughter (1934 film), directed by Isadore Freleng
The Miller's Daughter (album), 2005 album by The Drones
"The Miller's Daughter" (Once Upon a Time), an episode of the television series Once Upon a Time

See also
Fair Em or Fair Em, the Miller's Daughter of Manchester, Elizabethan era stage play